Following is a list of all Article III United States federal judges appointed by President Dwight D. Eisenhower during his presidency. In total Eisenhower appointed 185 Article III federal judges, including 5 Justices to the Supreme Court of the United States (including one Chief Justice), 45 judges to the United States Courts of Appeals, 130 judges to the United States district courts, 2 judges to the United States Court of Customs and Patent Appeals, 2 judges to the United States Court of Claims and 1 judge to the United States Customs Court.

Three federal courts were raised to Article III status during Eisenhower's tenure, the United States Court of Claims on July 28, 1953, the United States Customs Court on July 14, 1956, and the United States Court of Customs and Patent Appeals on August 25, 1958. Judges appointed prior to those dates are counted as Article I judicial appointments, later gaining Article III status by operation of law, while judges appointed after those dates are counted as Article III judicial appointments. Eisenhower appointed 5 total Article I federal judges to these courts, including 3 judges to the United States Court of Customs and Patent Appeals, 0 judges to the United States Court of Claims and 2 judges to the United States Customs Court.

United States Supreme Court justices

Courts of appeals

District courts

Specialty courts

United States Court of Customs and Patent Appeals

The United States Court of Customs and Patent Appeals became an Article III Court on August 25, 1958.

Judges appointed under Article III

Judges appointed under Article I

United States Court of Claims

The United States Court of Claims became an Article III Court on July 28, 1953.

Judges appointed under Article III

United States Customs Court

The United States Customs Court became an Article III Court on July 14, 1956.

Judges appointed under Article III

Judges appointed under Article I

Notes

Renominations

References
General
 
Specific

Sources
 Federal Judicial Center

Eisenhower